Sakrapee Thongsari (born 23 June 1962) is a retired Thai badminton player. He competed at the 1996 Atlanta Olympic Games in the men's doubles event with Pramote Teerawiwatana. Together with Teerawiwatana, they reached a career high as World No. 2 in the men's doubles event. Thongsari had also been a Thai national team coach.

Achievements

World Cup 
Men's doubles

Asian Championships 
Men's doubles

Southeast Asian Games 
Men's doubles

IBF World Grand Prix 
The World Badminton Grand Prix sanctioned by International Badminton Federation (IBF) since 1983.

Men's doubles

Mixed doubles

IBF International 
Men's doubles

References

External links 
 
 

Living people
1962 births
Sakrapee Thongsari
Badminton players at the 1996 Summer Olympics
Sakrapee Thongsari
Badminton players at the 1994 Asian Games
Competitors at the 1987 Southeast Asian Games
Competitors at the 1989 Southeast Asian Games
Competitors at the 1993 Southeast Asian Games
Competitors at the 1995 Southeast Asian Games
Sakrapee Thongsari
Sakrapee Thongsari
Southeast Asian Games medalists in badminton
Badminton coaches
Sakrapee Thongsari